Changesbowie is a compilation album by English rock musician David Bowie, released by Rykodisc in the US and by EMI in the UK in 1990. The compilation was part of Rykodisc's remastered Bowie reissue series, replacing the deleted RCA Records compilations Changesonebowie and Changestwobowie.

Reception
While the cover artwork was dismissed by author David Buckley as "a sixth-form cut 'n' paste collage", the collection gave Bowie his first UK chart-topping album since Tonight in 1984. The Guinness Book of British Hit Albums noted that Changesbowie was "his seventh album to enter the chart at number one. Nobody else had debuted at the top as often."

Track listing

 When Changesbowie was issued in Rykodisc's AU20 series on CD in 1996, "Fame '90" was replaced by the album version of "Fame." The front insert still listed the track list as containing the "Fame '90 remix." The back insert of the CD correctly listed "Fame" rather than "Fame '90 remix"; however, it omitted the track "Diamond Dogs." The back of the Obi wrap lists all tracks correctly.

Charts

Weekly charts

Year-end charts

Certifications

References

Sources

External links 
 

David Bowie compilation albums
1990 compilation albums
EMI Records compilation albums
Rykodisc compilation albums